Lord Bourne may refer to:

Geoffrey Bourne, Baron Bourne of Atherstone (1902–1982), British Army officer
Nick Bourne, Baron Bourne of Aberystwyth (born 1952), British politician